William E. Strickland  (born August 25, 1947, in Pittsburgh, Pennsylvania) is a community leader, author, and the President and CEO of the non-profit Manchester Bidwell Corporation based in Pittsburgh. The company's subsidiaries, the Manchester Craftsmen's Guild and Bidwell Training Center, work with disadvantaged and at-risk youth through involvement with the arts and provides job training for adults, respectively. Strickland is a winner of a MacArthur "Genius" Award and the 2011 Goi Peace Award.

Life
Strickland grew up in the Manchester neighborhood of Pittsburgh, Pennsylvania, and graduated from Oliver High School. He then attended the University of Pittsburgh, where as an undergraduate he founded the Manchester Craftsmen's Guild as an after-school program to teach children pottery skill in his old neighborhood.  He graduated cum laude with a bachelor's degree in American history and foreign relations in 1970. Following graduation he continued to build the Manchester Guild into an innovative nonprofit agency that uses the arts to inspire and mentor inner-city teenagers. In 1972 he took over the Bidwell Training Center that trains displaced adults for jobs.

He has served on the boards of the National Endowment for the Arts, Mellon Financial Corporation, and the University of Pittsburgh. For his work, Strickland has won various awards including a MacArthur Fellowship "genius" award in 1996. He has been honored by the White House, and received the Goi Peace Award in 2011.

In June 2018, Strickland announced that he would be stepping down from his role as president and CEO of Manchester Bidwell Corp., but that he will remain on as executive chairman. He had served as the leader of the organization for 50 years.

Awards
 1996: MacArthur Fellows Program
 2000: Strong Men and Women
 2007: Pittsburgher of the Year
 2011: Goi Peace Award

References

Further information
 
 Martha I. Finney, In the Face of Uncertainty: 25 Top Leaders Speak Out on Challenge, Change, and the Future of American Business, AMACOM Div American Mgmt Assn, 2002,

External links
 
 Manchester Bidwell Corporation website
 Manchester Craftsmen’s Guild website
 
 

1947 births
Living people
American nonprofit chief executives
MacArthur Fellows
Writers from Pittsburgh
University of Pittsburgh alumni